State Highway 140 (SH 140) is a  long state highway in the southwestern corner of Colorado. SH 140's southern terminus is at New Mexico State Road 170 (NM 170) at the New Mexico state line, and the northern terminus is at U.S. Route 160 (US 160) west of Durango.

Route description
SH 140 begins in the south on the Southern Ute Indian Reservation at the New Mexico state line where the road becomes New Mexico State Road 170 coming from Farmington, NM.  From the state line, the road proceeds northward passing near the town of Marvel and reaching its northern terminus at US 160 near the small town of Hesperus roughly eleven miles west of Durango.

Major intersections

References

External links

140
Transportation in La Plata County, Colorado